Gerhardine Ruth Peetoom (born 25 July 1967) is a Dutch politician of the Christian Democratic Appeal (CDA). She is the Party Chair of the Christian Democratic Appeal since 2 April 2011.

Biography 
Peetoom is born in the province of North Brabant and grew up in the eastern part of the province of Groningen. She studied theology and ethics at the Vrije Universiteit in Amsterdam. Being a preacher of the Protestant Church in the Netherlands (PKN), she has been employed at the St. Nicholaschurch (Nicolaïkerk) in Utrecht since 2006.

From 1999 to 2005 she was a CDA member of the States-Provincial of Groningen. In 2010 she was vice-chair of the Frissen Commission, which investigated the CDA's huge loss in the 2010 Dutch general election. In April 2011 she was elected Party Chair of the Christian Democratic Appeal with over 60% of votes.

References

External links
  Drs. G.R. (Ruth) Peetoom (Parlement & Politiek)
 

1967 births
Living people
Christian Democratic Appeal politicians
Protestant Church Christians from the Netherlands
Dutch women in politics
Women Christian clergy
Members of the Provincial Council of Groningen
Chairmen of the Christian Democratic Appeal
People from Breda
Politicians from Utrecht (city)
Vrije Universiteit Amsterdam alumni
21st-century Dutch Calvinist and Reformed ministers
Clergy from Utrecht (city)